Sieuwert van der Meulen (1663 – 18 June (buried) 1730) was an 18th-century painter from the Northern Netherlands.

Biography
He was born in Alkmaar, the son of Catharina Oostfries and Claes van der Meulen and became a member of the Alkmaar Guild of St. Luke in 1700. He designed and etched prints, for example a series of 16 etchings titled Navigiorum Aedificatio, on the history of a ship. This was published by Peter Schenk the Elder in Amsterdam and shows a pictorial documentary of how ships were built, launched, repaired, provisioned, and used in the early 18th century.

According to the RKD he is known for marinescapes and birds. He also worked in Haarlem, but died in his home town of Alkmaar.

References

Navigiorum Aedificatio online at Maritiem Digitaal
Sieuwert van der Meulen on Artnet

1663 births
1730 deaths
18th-century Dutch painters
18th-century Dutch male artists
Dutch male painters
People from Alkmaar
Painters from Alkmaar